Barlow's formula (called "Kesselformel" in German) relates the internal pressure that a pipe can withstand to its dimensions and the strength of its material.
This approximate formula is named after Peter Barlow, an English mathematician.

,

where

  : internal pressure,
 : allowable stress,
   : wall thickness,
 : outside diameter.

This formula (DIN 2413) figures prominently in the design of autoclaves and other pressure vessels.

Other formulations

The design of a complex pressure containment system involves much more than the application of Barlow's formula. For example, in 100 countries the ASME BPVCcode stipulates the requirements for design and testing of pressure vessels.

The formula is also common in the pipeline industry to verify that pipe used for gathering, transmission, and distribution lines can safely withstand operating pressures. The design factor is multiplied by the resulting pressure which gives the maximum operating pressure (MAOP) for the pipeline. In the United States, this design factor is dependent on Class locations which are defined in DOT Part 192. There are four class locations corresponding to four design factors:

External links
Barlow's Formula Calculator 
Barlow's Equation and Calculator 
Barlow's Formula Solver

References

Mathematical analysis
Piping
Pressure vessels